Borderlands is an upcoming American science fiction action comedy film directed by Eli Roth, from a screenplay he co-wrote with Craig Mazin, based on the video game series of the same name developed by Gearbox Software and published by 2K. It stars an ensemble cast featuring Cate Blanchett, Kevin Hart, Jack Black, and Jamie Lee Curtis. The film is produced by Ari and Avi Arad, and Erik Feig, under their Arad Productions and Picturestart company banners, respectively.

Borderlands is set to be released in the United States by Lionsgate Films.

Premise

Cast
 Cate Blanchett as Lilith
 Kevin Hart as Roland
 Jack Black as Claptrap
 Jamie Lee Curtis as Dr. Patricia Tannis
 Ariana Greenblatt as Tiny Tina
 Florian Munteanu as Krieg
 Haley Bennett
 Édgar Ramírez as Atlas
 Bobby Lee as Larry
 Olivier Richters as Krom
 Janina Gavankar as Commander Knoxx
 Gina Gershon as Mad Moxxi
 Cheyenne Jackson as Jakobs
 Charles Babalola as Hammerlock
 Benjamin Byron Davis as Marcus
 Steven Boyer as Scooter
 Ryann Redmond as Ellie

Additionally, Penn Jillette has a cameo  in the film as a preacher overseeing a wedding, after voicing Pain in Borderlands 3.

Production
A film adaptation of the video game series was first announced in August 2015 with Lionsgate Films developing the project with Ari and Avi Arad of Arad Productions producing. In February 2020, Eli Roth was attached to direct the film from a screenplay written by Craig Mazin, with Erik Feig joining as producer through his production company Picturestart. Cate Blanchett, who collaborated with Roth on The House with a Clock in Its Walls (2018), entered negotiations to play the role of Lilith in May 2020, with Lionsgate confirming she would star later in the month. Kevin Hart was confirmed to play Roland in January 2021. In February, Jamie Lee Curtis was cast to play Dr. Patricia Tannis, with Jack Black, who also collaborated with Roth on The House with a Clock in Its Walls, cast to provide the voice of Claptrap. The following month, Ariana Greenblatt and Florian Munteanu were cast as Tiny Tina and Krieg respectively, with Haley Bennett cast in an undisclosed role.

Filming officially commenced on April 1, 2021, in Hungary and wrapped on June 22. Édgar Ramírez, Olivier Richters, and Janina Gavankar joined the cast the same month alongside Gina Gershon, Cheyenne Jackson, Charles Babalola, Benjamin Byron Davis, Steven Boyer, Ryann Redmond, and Bobby Lee. Penn Jillette, who had a voice role in Borderlands 3 as Pain, revealed he was to shoot scenes for a small role in the film as a preacher.

On June 4, 2021, first look images of the cast were released. The black and white images obscured all but the cast's silhouettes.

In January 2023, it was announced the film would be going through two weeks of reshoots helmed by Tim Miller, due to Roth's commitments to Thanksgiving. While Roth would not be involved with the reshoots, he remains attached to the movie and gave Miller his blessing.

Music
In June 2021, Nathan Barr was announced to score the film, having previously collaborated with Roth in some of his previous works.

Release
Borderlands is set to be released theatrically in the United States by Lionsgate Films. On November 9, 2022 test screenings were held.

Marketing
During Lionsgate's panel at the 2022 CinemaCon, approximately one-minute of exclusive footage was shown. However, as of 2023, nothing was released to the public.

See also
 List of films based on video games

References

External links
 
 

American action comedy films
American science fiction comedy films
Borderlands (series)
Films about extraterrestrial life
Films directed by Eli Roth
Films produced by Avi Arad
Films scored by Nathan Barr
Films set on fictional planets
Films shot in Hungary
Lionsgate films
Live-action films based on video games
Upcoming English-language films
Upcoming films